Lightning Strike is a 2012 Italian comedy film directed by Neri Parenti and starring Christian De Sica and Lillo & Greg. It was a commercial success, grossing $13,378,892 at the Italian box office.

For her performance in this film Anna Foglietta was nominated for Silver Ribbon for Best Supporting Actress.

Plot 
The film is divided into two episodes. In the first episode the primary Alberto Benni risks arrest because he has evaded taxes. So run away in a small village in  Trentino Alto Adige, posing as a priest. He also falls in love with a beautiful policewoman...

In the second story, Ermete Maria Grilli is the Ambassador of Italy in Vatican, and has as chauffeur his friend Lillo. One day Ermeyte, beautiful, elegant and fine character, falls in love with a vulgar fishwife girl, but funny and beautiful. Ermete then asks his friend Lillo one thing: to be turned into a perfect Roman vulgar peasant in order to please Angela.

Cast 

Christian De Sica as Alberto Benni
Greg as Ermete Maria Grilli
Lillo as  Ferdinando
Luisa Ranieri as  Angela
Arisa as  Tina
Anna Foglietta as  Adele Ventresca
 Simone Barbato as  Oscar 
  Debora Caprioglio as Francesca 
 Luis Molteni as Don Dino
 Chiara Sani  as Marcella Bolin
 Vauro as Don Brunoro 
 Gabriele Pignotta  as Sergio
 Fabio Avaro as Lallo
 Lallo Circosta as Facinoroso
 Armando De Razza  as Cardinal  Pini Sburga
 Martine Brochard as Ermete's mother 
 Gina Rovere as Capatrice

References

External links

2012 comedy films
2012 films
Italian comedy films
Films directed by Neri Parenti
Films set in Trentino-Alto Adige/Südtirol
2010s Italian films